Bokarvada is a village in Visnagar Taluka of Mahesana district in Gujarat, India.

Places of interest
There is an ancient Panchayatan Hindu temple in the village.

Amentites
The village has a primary school and a post office.

References

Villages in Mehsana district